Hypatopa joniella is a moth in the family Blastobasidae. It is found in Costa Rica.

The length of the forewings is 9.5–10.2 mm. The forewings are pale brown intermixed with reddish-brown and brown scales. The hindwings are translucent pale brown, slightly darkening towards the apex.

Etymology
The specific is named in honor of Jon David Adamski, who collected the species together with the author who first described the species.

References

Moths described in 2013
Hypatopa